Lin Evola (born 1950) is an American artist. She is best known for making metal sculptures of angels out of melted weapons such as guns or nuclear weapons casings. She has been honored at the United Nations by Sergio Duarte, has collected weapons to build a statue at One Police Plaza in New York City, and has gifted a work to Bill Clinton, "the first recipient of a Peace Angel".

Peace Angel 
Evola's "Renaissance Peace Angel" sculpture, composed of bronze and decommissioned weapons, was added as one of the exhibits at the National September 11 Memorial & Museum on October 22, 2018. The work was previously installed in front of Nino's American Kitchen in lower Manhattan following the September 11 attacks. The sculpture's concrete plinth bears the signatures of many Ground Zero workers and volunteers.

USA Weapons Destruction Campaign 
The objective of the USA Weapons Destruction Campaign, founded by Evola in partnership with Sim's Metal Management, is to shift American citizens away from violence as weapons are collected and permanently transformed into Peace Angel Monuments which will stand to remind us as a nation to value life.

References

External links
. 

20th-century American painters
American women painters
21st-century American painters
1950 births
Living people
20th-century American sculptors
20th-century American women artists
21st-century American women artists
Recycled art artists